Shenyangbei (Shenyang North) railway station  is a railway station on several railways: the Harbin–Dalian section of the Beijing–Harbin High-Speed Railway, Jingha Railway, Hada Railway, Qinshen Passenger Railway, Shenda Railway, Shenji Railway, Jingha Passenger Dedicated Line and Hada Passenger Railway. It is located in Shenyang, Liaoning province, China.

History
The station opened in 1911. Shenyang North railway station was formerly the "Liaoning main station" before 1946 and colloquially known as the "Old North Station". The original building was built in 1927. The current Main Station Building began construction in 1986, was commissioned for operation in December 1990, and became one of the five most important railway hubs in China, earning itself the nickname "Northeast's No. 1 Station".

In 2011, a huge expansion project known as the "North Station Transport Hub Reconstruction Project" was initiated in response to the growing demand for floor area posed by the increasing passenger traffic after introduction of the high-speed rail service. The station now has an additional 3-storey "Sub-Station Building" and a "Northern Square" on the north (Huanggu District) side of the railways, while the old waiting lounge in the original 16-storey Main Station Building is now relocated to a large elevated concourse that bridges over the rail tracks, with a pillar-less roof (the largest in mainland China) doming the platforms. The South Square outside the Main Station Building was rebuilt into a multi-levelled complex, with two above ground forming an elevated airport-style drop-off zone and a large ground-level area for bus stops, as well as a three-level underground city providing shopping malls, car parks, taxi pick-up and interchange with Subway Line 2, while also capable of rapid conversion into an air raid shelter if needed.

See also

 Chinese Eastern Railway
 South Manchuria Railway
 South Manchuria Railway Zone
 Shenyang Metro
 Shenyang railway station
 Shenyang South railway station

References

Railway stations in China opened in 1911
Transport in Shenyang
Buildings and structures in Shenyang
Railway stations in Liaoning
Stations on the Harbin–Dalian High-Speed Railway
Stations on the Qinhuangdao–Shenyang High-Speed Railway
Stations on the Beijing–Harbin Railway
Stations on the Shenyang–Dalian Railway
Stations on the Harbin–Dalian Railway
Stations on the Shenyang–Jilin Railway